Epimolis haemastica is a moth of the family Erebidae. It was described by Paul Dognin in 1906. It is found in Peru and Colombia.

Subspecies
Epimolis haemastica haemastica (Peru)
Epimolis haemastica parvimacula (Rothschild, 1910) (Colombia)

References

Phaegopterina
Moths described in 1906